Midnight's Mask is a fantasy novel by Paul S. Kemp, set in the world of the Forgotten Realms, and based on the Dungeons & Dragons role-playing game. It is the third novel in "The Erevis Cale Trilogy". It was published in paperback in November 2005.  The Erevis Cale Trilogy was later reprinted as an omnibus in June 2010.

Plot summary
Erevis Cale is one of the Chosen of the deity Mask. The novel follows Cale along his path away from his own humanity.

Reception
In a positive review, Don D'Ammassa wrote that the story is "complex", highlighting how the main character "is a man tormented by questions of right and wrong."

References

Forgotten Realms novels